Avadhut Anil Tatkare (born 3 December 1978) is an Indian politician. He served as the Member of Legislative Assembly from Shrivardhan, Maharashtra from 2014 to 2019. He was also the mayor of Roha for 7 years and Deputy Mayor for 2.5 years. He currently belongs to the Bharatiya Janata Party.

References

1979 births
Living people
Shiv Sena politicians
Nationalist Congress Party politicians from Maharashtra
People from Raigad district
Maharashtra MLAs 2014–2019
21st-century Indian women politicians
Women members of the Maharashtra Legislative Assembly